The second season of America's Best Dance Crew premiered on June 19, 2008. The live auditions special took place on June 7, 2008. The season was hosted by Mario Lopez, featured Layla Kayleigh as the backstage correspondent, and included Lil Mama, JC Chasez, and Shane Sparks as judges. In the live finale, which aired on August 21, 2008, Super CR3W was declared the winner.

Cast
For the second season of America's Best Dance Crew, the dance crews auditioned in four cities: New York City, Atlanta, Houston, and Los Angeles. A total of fourteen dance crews were selected from the four cities and then categorized into four regions: Midwest, South, East Coast, and West Coast. Following the live casting special on June 7, 2008, the initial pool of dance crews was narrowed down to ten.

Results

: The live auditions special determined the ten spots for the season premiere.
: A non-elimination episode meant to showcase the two finalists.
Key
 (WINNER) The dance crew won the competition and was crowned "America's Best Dance Crew".
 (RUNNER-UP) The dance crew was the runner-up in the competition.
 (IN) The dance crew was safe from elimination.
 (RISK) The dance crew was at risk for elimination.
 (OUT) The dance crew was eliminated from the competition.

Episodes

Episode 0: Casting Special
Original Airdate: June 7, 2008
Fourteen dance crews competed in a live casting special for America's Best Dance Crew. The reigning champions, JabbaWockeeZ, performed to a remix of "The Boss" by Rick Ross featuring T-Pain at the end of the episode.

Episode 1: Crew's Choice Challenge
Original Airdate: June 19, 2008
Each crew performed to songs of their own choosing.

Safe: SoReal Cru, Supreme Soul, Xtreme Dance Force, A.S.I.I.D., Boogie Bots, Super CR3W, Phresh Select, Sass x7
Bottom 2: Fanny Pak, Distorted X
Eliminated: Distorted X

Episode 2: Video Star Challenge
Original Airdate: June 26, 2008
The crews created routines inspired by iconic music videos.

Safe: Super CR3W, Fanny Pak, Supreme Soul, Phresh Select, A.S.I.I.D., SoReal Cru, Xtreme Dance Force
Bottom 2: Boogie Bots, Sass x7
Eliminated: Sass x7

Episode 3: Rock the Title Challenge
Original Airdate: July 3, 2008
Each crew utilized a physical transformation to visually illustrate the title of their song.

Safe: A.S.I.I.D., SoReal Cru, Super CR3W, Boogie Bots, Fanny Pak, Supreme Soul
Bottom 2: Phresh Select, Xtreme Dance Force
Eliminated: Xtreme Dance Force

Episode 4: Speed Up Challenge
Original Airdate: July 10, 2008
The crews had to transition from a slow tempo song to a faster one while still remaining on beat.

Safe: Boogie Bots, Super CR3W, A.S.I.I.D., SoReal Cru, Fanny Pak
Bottom 2: Phresh Select, Supreme Soul
Eliminated: Phresh Select

Episode 5: Janet Jackson Challenge
Original Airdate: July 17, 2008
The episode began with a group performance to Janet Jackson's "Rhythm Nation". Then, each crew was given a Janet Jackson song and had to incorporate her signature style and moves into their dance.

Safe: Fanny Pak, Supreme Soul, Boogie Bots, SoReal Cru
Bottom 2: Super CR3W, A.S.I.I.D.
Eliminated: A.S.I.I.D.

Episode 6: Bring The Beat Challenge
Original Airdate: July 24, 2008
The crews were assigned a song and a school activity. They were required to utilize the stage props, themed after a high school gym, to create the beats for their routine.

Safe: Fanny Pak, SoReal Cru, Boogie Bots
Bottom 2: Super CR3W, Supreme Soul
Eliminated: Supreme Soul

Episode 7: Missy Elliott Challenge
Original Airdate: July 31, 2008
The episode opened with a group performance to Missy Elliott's "Shake Your Pom Pom". Afterwards, the crews adapted the footwork from her music videos to showcase their own style. Elliott starred as the first guest judge on America's Best Dance Crew, helping the regular judges select which crew was eliminated.

Safe: SoReal Cru, Super CR3W
Bottom 2: Boogie Bots, Fanny Pak
Eliminated: Boogie Bots

Episode 8: Eighties Theme Challenge
Original Airdate: August 7, 2008
The remaining three crews competed in two challenges inspired by the 1980s.

Challenge #1: Groove Step Challenge
Each crew built routines featuring popular party dances from the '80s. In addition, the crews had to complete the physical task assigned to them.

Challenge #2: Dance Movie Challenge
The crews crafted routines that incorporated elements of classic '80s films. The crews were given remixed versions of the songs from their respective movies.

Safe: SoReal Cru
Bottom 2: Super CR3W, Fanny Pak
Eliminated: Fanny Pak

Episode 9: Championship Showdown
Original Airdate: August 14, 2008
In a non-elimination episode, the final two crews faced off in three rounds of challenges.

Challenge #1: Around the World Challenge
Dancing to the same mix of songs, the crews created routines that included different dance styles from around the world.

Challenge #2: Original Dance Craze Challenge
Working with music producers to write and create an original soundtrack, the crews had to create their own dance craze.

Challenge #3: Last Chance Challenge
The two finalists were given one last chance to perform before the lines opened for the final voting session of the season.

Episode 10: The Live Finale
Original Airdate: August 21, 2008
The eliminated crews returned and performed with the finalists for a regional collaboration. Instead of going head-to-head, Super CR3W and SoReal Cru teamed up for their last performance.

Winner: Super CR3W
Runner-up: SoReal Cru

Episode 11: Battle for the VMAs
Original Airdate: August 30, 2008
At the beginning of the show, champions JabbaWockeeZ and Super CR3W performed to a remix of "We Are the Champions" by Queen.

Five crews from the first and second seasons were given music videos nominated for "Best Dancing in a Video" at the 2008 MTV Video Music Awards. The crews had to incorporate the moves from the videos while retaining their own style. In the end, the judges chose their three favorite performances. After votes were cast, the two crews with the highest number of votes would perform at the VMA preshow.

Fanny Pak and Kaba Modern were eventually selected to compete against each other at the preshow.

Lindsay Lohan and Ciara later announced that Fanny Pak was the winner of the battle and received $25,000 (USD) for charity.

References

External links 
 

2008 American television seasons
America's Best Dance Crew